Ahmad Shah (11 November 1917 – 13 April 1997), known by his pen name as Farigh Bukhari (romanized: Fārigh Buk̲h̲ārī), was a Pakistani multilingual poet and progressive writer. He wrote books, including poetry on various subjects such as literature, social issues and politics in Hindko, Pashto and predominantly in Urdu language. Some of his publications appears about universal values and humanism.

Farigh was born in British India (in modern-day Peshawar, Pakistan). He along with Raza Hamdani is credited for introducing Urdu literature to Pukhtuns of Attock city, making him the 20th century's first writer of Peshawar translating Urdu into Pashto literature.

Literary career
He started writing around in 1934, and participated in a mushaira in Calcutta (now Kolkata) where he recited his first-ever ghazal presided over an Urdu poet Raza Ali Wahsat. Besides gazals, a few of his poetic conversations appears emotional and imaginative. He used to criticise wars through his poetry. In 1971, he wrote about East Pakistan (in modern-day Bangladesh), and covered historical events of the war. Later, he opposed military conflicts occurred in East Bengal through one of his poetry collection titled the tragedy of East Bengal.

Prior to writing about 1971, he wrote Urdu poetry collection titled Zairo Bam in January 1952, and his house in Peshawar was subsequently raided by the local police and arrested him for his not-known involvement in keeping formula of an explosive device called "zero bomb". He was also imprisoned, and later displaced for writing about politics involving plural society and social justice. In 1991, he wrote a book titled Tahrik-i Azadi Aur Baca Khan (Freedom movement and Bacha Khan) on a Pashtun activist Abdul Ghaffar Khan covering his independence struggle and political movements carried out during the period of partition. The book was later published by the University of California on 5 March 2007.

Bibliography

References

Notes

External links 
Farigh Bukhari at Rekhta Foundation

1917 births
1997 deaths
People from Peshawar
Urdu-language writers from Pakistan
Pashto-language poets
20th-century Pakistani poets